Chair Peak is a peak rising west of Mount Britannia on Rongé Island, off the west coast of Graham Land. This descriptive name was given by M.C. Lester and T.W. Bagshawe, who wintered at nearby Waterboat Point in 1921–22 and used this peak as a prominent landmark during their survey.

References
 

Mountains of Graham Land
Danco Coast